Scipion Abeille (died 9 December 1697) was a French surgeon and poet.

Abeille was born at Riez in the French province Provence, (now in Alpes-de-Haute-Provence), and was the brother of Gaspard Abeille.

He also wrote , Paris, 1696.

External links
 Dictionnaire géographique ... des Gaules ...

Year of birth missing
1697 deaths
17th-century French physicians
17th-century French poets
17th-century French male writers
French male poets